Tyler Arnone (born November 1, 1991) is an American soccer player.

Career

Youth
Arnone spent his youth career with New York Hota and Albertson SC before signing a letter of intent to play college soccer at St. John's University.

High school
2009 Jim Steen Award - The Jim Steen Award is awarded to Nassau County's player of the year. 2009 AA-1 Conference player of the year.

College
After redshirting his freshman year in 2010, Arnone decided to transfer to the University of Michigan.  He made a total of 75 appearances for the Wolverines and tallied 12 goals and 15 assists. He finished his career ninth in all time shots attempted (145), eighth all-time in school history in assists (15), fifth in all time matches started (75), fourth in all time minutes played (6,621), and Arnone was one of only FOUR Wolverines in University of Michigan Men's Soccer History to be named All-Big Ten in three seasons.

Individual Accolades:

2011 Big Ten All-Freshman Team

2012 & 2013 Team MVP

2012 & 2013 First Team All-Big Ten

2012,2013,2014 Big Ten Preseason Watch List Member

2013 Big Ten All-Tournament

2013 Big Ten Midfielder of the Year

2013 All-Great Lakes Region First Team

2013 All-American

2013 & 2014 University of Michigan Team Captain

2014 Pre-Season All American

2014 All Big Ten Second Team

2014 College Sports Madness All American

2014 TopDrawerSoccer.com Best XI Third Team

2014 TopDrawerSoccer.com Top 50 players in the country

PDL
He also played in the Premier Development League for Long Island Rough Riders.

Professional
On March 10, 2015, Arnone signed a professional contract with Major League Soccer Real Salt Lake and USL club Real Monarchs SLC.  He made his professional debut on April 17 in a 5–2 defeat to Colorado Springs Switchbacks FC.

References

External links
Michigan Wolverines bio
USSF Development Academy

1991 births
Living people
American soccer players
St. John's Red Storm men's soccer players
Michigan Wolverines men's soccer players
Long Island Rough Riders players
Real Monarchs players
Association football midfielders
Soccer players from New York (state)
USL League Two players
USL Championship players